CLG Réalt na Mara, or, in the English language, Star of the Sea GAA, is a Gaelic football-only GAA club based in Bundoran, County Donegal, Ireland. The club fields both men's and ladies' teams at underage to senior level.

As of 2022, Brian McEniff remains chairman of the club.

History
In the 1920s, the location of Bundoran on the railway line made the Bundoran local ground a convenient venue for many big games. The GAA club grounds were purchased in 1938. The club was reorganised and renamed 'The Star of the Sea'. The football park has undergone many developments throughout the years. The ground was levelled in 1947 and enclosed in 1951. The club changing rooms were constructed in 1972.

The juniors were successful in both the 1956 and 1960 Championships. In 1963, "Star of the Sea" joined with Ballyshannon team, Aodh Ruadh to become St Joseph's. That team included many players that contributed to the Donegal county team, including Brian McEniff and the former Donegal County Council Manager Michael McLoone. In 1977, the club was again divided into two clubs, one each for the towns of Bundoran and Ballyshannon.

Bundoran won the first even Donegal senior championship title when they defeated Red Hughs of Killygordon in a replayed final in the Brandywell in Derry. It was in fact the 2019 championship but a series of delays ensured the replay was in March 1920. The club were again senior champions in 1934 and along with Ballyshannon were part of the phenomenally successful St Josephs side that dominated Donegal club football in the late 1960s and early to mid-1970s winning eight titles as well as the first, though unofficial, All-Ireland club championship in 1968 defeating Dunmore McHales in the final. St Josephs broke up in the 1976 and in 1977 Réalt na Mara went on to win the first ever Intermediate title following this up with Senior Championship success in 1979, overcoming Seán MacCumhaill's in a nail-biting one-point victory to win the Senior Championship.

Local man Brian McEniff led Donegal to their first ever Ulster title in 1972 and won managed the County to four more Ulster successes before managing Donegal to their first ever  All-Ireland Senior Football Championship in 1992, in which they defeated Dublin in the final 0–18 to 0–14. Bundoran was the scene of enormous celebrations for almost a month afterwards.

In 2010, Réalt na Mara won the Donegal Intermediate Football Championship. They again won the Donegal Intermediate Football Championship in 2015 and advanced the same year to the Ulster Intermediate Club Football Championship final, where they lost to Loughinisland.

Notable players

 Jamie Brennan — 2018 and 2019 Ulster SFC winner
 Paul Brennan — 2018 and 2019 Ulster SFC winner

 Brian McEniff — 1992 All-Ireland SFC winning manager

Managers

Honours
 Donegal Senior Football Championship:  1934, 1979
 Donegal Intermediate Football Championship: 1977, 2010, 2015
 Ulster Intermediate Club Football Championship runner-up: 2015

References

GAA
Gaelic football clubs in County Donegal
Gaelic games clubs in County Donegal